The 1920 Copa de Competencia Final was the final that decided the champion of the first edition of this national cup of Argentina, organised by dissident body Asociación Amateurs de Football.

The match was held in Estadio GEBA (home venue of Club Gimnasia y Esgrima de Buenos Aires) on December 12, 1920, where Rosario Central defeated Sportivo Almagro 2–0.

Qualified teams 

Note

Overview 

The "Asociación Amateurs de Football" was a dissident association that had split from the AFA in 1919. The AAmF organised in 1920 its own cup competition, named "Copa de Competencia" as it was a usual practise on those times.

This edition was contested by 21 teams, 19 within Buenos Aires Province and 2 from Liga Rosarina (Rosario Central and Nacional) that entered directly to the second round. The cup had a single-elimination tournament format.

Rosario Central reached the final after beating River Plate (2–0), counterpart Nacional (3–2), San Isidro (2–0 in semifinal).

On the other side, Sportivo Almagro earned its right to play the final after beating Barracas Central (2–0), Lanús (3–2), and Racing (20 in semifinals).

In the final, played at Estadio G.E.B.A., Rosario Central beat Almagro 2-0 with goals by Harry Hayes and Antonio Macías to win their 5th. national cup.

Match details

References

c
c
1920 in Argentine football
1920 in South American football